This is a list of notable graduates of Manhattan College in Riverdale, New York.

Notable alumni

Academia

Joseph A. Alutto – executive vice president and provost of Ohio State University
Jeanette Brown – former president of the Water Environment Federation
 Frederick W. Capshaw – Class of 1966 – President of Community College of Philadelphia from December 15, 1993 until his death at age 53 on June 23, 1998
Edward Countryman – Class of 1966 – distinguished professor of history at Southern Methodist University
Christopher Coyne  – Class of 1999 – F.A. Harper Professor of Economics at George Mason University
 David Danahar – Class of 1963 – President of Southwest Minnesota State University
 Kevin J. Farley – distinguished professor at Manhattan College
Robert Jastrow – first chairman of NASA's Lunar Exploration Committee, professor at Yale and Dartmouth, recipient of Doctor of Science (honorary)
Charles H. Lochmuller – award-winning professor of chemistry at Duke University
George E. McCarthy – National Endowment for the Humanities Distinguished Teaching Professor of Sociology at Kenyon College
Kevin V. Mulcahy- Sheldon Beychok Distinguished Professor Louisiana State University 
John J. Neuhauser – President of Saint Michael's College from 2007 till 2018
William E. O'Connell – Chessie Professor of Finance Emeritus at The College of William and Mary
L. Jay Oliva – 14th President of New York University
Henry Petroski – award-winning professor of civil engineering at Duke University
Ángel Ramos – founder of the National Hispanic Council of the Deaf and Hard of Hearing, Superintendent of the Idaho School for the Deaf and the Blind
 Katharine Capshaw Smith – award-winning Professor of English at the University of Connecticut
James Vreeland – associate professor of International Relations at Georgetown University
Erick Weinberg – professor of theoretical physics at Columbia University
 Donald f. Costello – associate professor emeritus of Computer science and engineering University of Nebraska – Lincoln

Arts and literature
Sam Barone – historical novelist with novels centered on early Antiquity
William Edmund Barrett – author of The Left Hand of God and Lilies of the Field
Nakia D. Johnson, African-American novelist
Paul Mariani – poet, biographer, and essayist -- Internationally Known Poet to Give Reading at Georgian Court University
James Patterson – New York Times best-selling and Edgar Award-winning novelist, author of Along Came a Spider and Kiss the Girls
Al Sarrantonio – science fiction, mystery and horror author and winner of the Bram Stoker Award.
Robert Shea – co-author (with Robert Anton Wilson) of The Illuminatus! Trilogy
George A. Sheehan – cardiologist and New York Times bestselling author of Running & Being: The Total Experience

Business
 John Banks III – President Emeritus of the Real Estate Board of New York
Sam Belnavis – NASCAR owner
John M. Fahey – President and Chief Executive Officer of the National Geographic Society
Frank M. Folsom – former president of RCA Victor and permanent representative of the Holy See
Thomas Gambino – New York mobster and a longtime caporegime of the Gambino crime family
Frederick W. Gluck '57 – former Vice Chairman of Bechtel and managing partner of McKinsey & Co.
John Horan '40 – former chairman & CEO of Merck
Lynn Martin – 68th president of the New York Stock Exchange
Eugene R. McGrath – former chairman and CEO of Con Edison
Joe Mohen – internet entrepreneur
Roderick McMahon – professional wrestling and boxing promoter; patriarch of the McMahon wrestling family
Thomas J. Moran – president and CEO of Mutual of America Life Insurance Company
Eileen Murray – former CEO of Investment Risk Management LLC
Thomas D. O'Mally '63 – successful commodities trader; former chairman & CEO of Premcor who created the modern independent refining industry
Joseph M. Tucci – chairman, president and CEO of the EMC Corporation
Stephen Squeri - Chairman and CEO of the American Express
Richard L. Tomasetti - Bachelors of Civil Engineering, class of 1963 - Founding principal and former chairman of Thornton Tomasetti

Entertainment
Frank Campanella – TV and motion picture actor, Captain Video
Joseph Campanella – TV, stage, and motion picture actor, Mannix
Alexandra Chando – actress, Maddie on As the World Turns
Dennis Day – TV and radio personality, The Jack Benny Show
Katie Henry – blues rock singer, guitarist, pianist and songwriter
Barnard Hughes – Emmy and Tony Award winning actor, Hugh Leonard's Da
Mike Mazurki – former professional wrestler and character actor
Hugo Montenegro – TV and movie soundtrack composer, I Dream of Jeannie and The Outcasts
Glenn Hughes – founding member of The Village People, as the biker.
Liam O'Brien – screenwriter and television producer best known for writing the movie 'Here Comes the Groom

Journalism
James Brady – New York City celebrity tabloid columnist who created the Page Six gossip column in the New York Post
Don Dunphy – Boxing announcer, Radio Hall of Fame inductee
Jerry Girard – former sportscaster, WPIX
 Mario Nacinovich '94 – Managing Partner of the US healthcare practice at AXON and in 2013 became Editor Emeritus Journal of Communication in Healthcare
Jim Ryan – news anchor for WNBC-TV, WNYW and WCBS-TV
Judith West – entrepreneur business woman, political activist, radio personality and hosts her own cable network TV Show, Getting Your Money's Worth

Government and public policy
Phil Amicone – 41st Mayor of Yonkers, New York
Vincent H. Auleta – former member of the New York State Assembly
John J. Boylan – former member of U.S. House of Representatives for New York's 15th congressional district
Thomas J. Curry – 30th Comptroller of the Currency of the United States 
John J. Delaney – former member of U.S. House of Representatives for New York's 7th congressional district
Thomas R. Donahue – former Secretary-Treasurer, AFL–CIO
John J. Fitzgerald – former member of U.S. House of Representatives for New York's 7th congressional district
Hugh J. Grant – 91st Mayor of New York City
Rudy Giuliani – 2008 U.S. Presidential Candidate and former Mayor of New York City
Ronald Green – head of the United Worker's Party; former member of the House of Assembly of Dominica
Raymond W. Kelly '63 – Commissioner of the New York City Police Department
Mike Lawler '09 – Member of the New York State Assembly, representing Rockland County
Arthur J. Lichte – United States Air Force General and Commander of the Air Mobility Command
William Lucas – Wayne County Executive and 1986 Michigan gubernatorial candidate
Joseph Maguire – Vice Admiral of the United States Navy
Serphin Maltese – former member of the New York State Senate
John McCarthy '61 – former U.S. Ambassador to Tunisia
Dominic J. Monetta – former Deputy Director of Defense Research and Engineering (Research and Advanced Technology) at the U.S. Department of Defense from 1991–1993, and Former Director, Office of New Production Reactors, at the United States Department of Energy from 1989–1991

Thomas McNamara '62 – former Assistant Secretary of State for Political-Military Affairs and U.S. Ambassador to Colombia
Chang Myon – 2nd and 7th Prime Minister of South Korea
Bill Owens (congressman) – U.S. Representative for New York's 23rd congressional district
Peter A. Quinn – former U.S. Representative from New York
James Rispoli – Assistant Secretary of Energy for Environmental Management
Angelo D. Roncallo – former member of U.S. House of Representatives for New York's 3rd congressional district
Russell Schriefer – political strategist and media consultant
José M. Serrano – New York State Senator representing the South Bronx, East Harlem, Yorkville and Roosevelt Island
Thomas Francis Smith – former member of U.S. House of Representatives for New York
Andrew Lawrence Somers – former member of U.S. House of Representatives for New York's 6th congressional district and New York's 10th congressional district
James J. Walsh – former member of U.S. House of Representatives for New York
Thomas Michael Whalen III – three-term Mayor of Albany, New York

Law
Anthony V. Cardona (MC1966RIP) – Presiding Justice, Appellate Division, Third Judicial Department, New York Supreme Court
Ronald L. Ellis – Magistrate Judge of the United States District Court for the Southern District of New York
Joseph Raymond Jackson – former Judge of the United States Court of Customs and Patent Appeals
John F. Keenan – Judge for the United States District Court for the Southern District of New York
John S. Martin – former U.S. Attorney and Judge for United States District for the Southern District of New York
John H. Mark, Jr. – U.S. Army Major JAG (Troop B. Cavalry) and President of St. John's University School of Law Student Body Association ('03)
Richard C. Wilbur – judge of the United States Tax Court

Math and science
Kevin Campbell – Principal Investigator for the Howard Hughes Medical Institute; internationally recognized for his contributions to muscular dystrophy research
James W. Cooley – mathematician, co-author of the FFT (fast Fourier transform) algorithm used in digital processing
Peter J. Denning – award-winning computer scientist best known for inventing the working-set model for program behavior, which defeated thrashing in operating systems and became the reference standard for all memory management policies
Michael J. Flynn – professor emeritus of computer science at Stanford University; recipient of Harry H. Goode Memorial Award
Edward E. Hammer – IEEE Edison Medal for fluorescent lighting research
Valery Havard – botanist for whom many Texas plants are named, including the Chisos bluebonnet (Lupinus havardii), Havard oak (Quercus havardii), and Havard's evening primrose (Oenothera havardii)
Michael Walsh – Vehicle emissions engineer and 2005 MacArthur Fellow
Erick Weinberg – physicist at Columbia University

Religion
Patrick Ahern – former Auxiliary Bishop of New York
Austin Dowling – former Archbishop of Saint Paul and Minneapolis
Patrick Joseph Hayes – former Cardinal Archbishop of New York
Bryan Joseph McEntegart – former Bishop of Ogdensburg and Brooklyn
John Joseph Mitty – former Archbishop of San Francisco
George Mundelein – former Cardinal Archbishop of Chicago
John Joseph Thomas Ryan – Archbishop for the Military Services and Anchorage
Michael Angelo Saltarelli – former Bishop of Wilmington

Sports

Baseball
Luis Castro – second Latin-American to play Major League Baseball (MLB)
George Chalmers – former MLB player
Pat Duff – former MLB catcher/first baseman
Bill Finley – former MLB catcher/outfielder
Joe Gallagher – former MLB player
Buddy Hassett – former MLB player
Andy Karl – former MLB player
Chris Mahoney – former MLB pitcher
Charlie Meara – former MLB outfielder
Cotton Minahan – former MLB pitcher
Mike Parisi – pitcher for Memphis Redbirds, St. Louis Cardinals
Xavier Rescigno – former MLB player
Matt Rizzotti – infielder for Lehigh Valley IronPigs, Philadelphia Phillies
Doc Scanlan – former MLB player
Chuck Schilling – former MLB player
Brewery Jack Taylor – former MLB player
Henry Thielman – former MLB player
Jake Thielman – former MLB player
Nick Tremark – former MLB player
Tom Waddell – former MLB pitcher
Eddie Zimmerman – former MLB player

Basketball
David Bernsley - American-Israeli basketball player
George Bruns – former National Basketball Association (NBA) player
George Bucci – former American Basketball Association (ABA) player
Jack Byrnes - former American Basketball League (ABL) player, arrested for working with Hank Poppe and a gambling syndicate to fix Manhattan basketball games
Bill Campion – former NBA player, drafted in 1975 by the Milwaukee Bucks
Neil Cohalan – first professional basketball coach of the New York Knicks
Luis Flores – former NBA point guard, 2009 top scorer in the Israel Basketball Premier League
Junius Kellogg – former Harlem Globetrotter; team member who reported college basketball point-shaving scheme 
Kevin Laue – received a scholarship to play Division I basketball for Manhattan College
John Leonard - former Continental Basketball Association (CBA) player and college coach
Ricky Marsh – former NBA player
Brian Mahoney – former ABA player and college coach
Henry "Hank" Poppe - former ABL player, arrested for approaching Junius Kellogg to fix Manhattan basketball games
Chris Smith – basketball player for Hapoel Galil Elyon of the Israeli Liga Leumit

Football
Vincent dePaul Draddy – Manhattan College quarterback who developed the Izod and Lacoste brands. College Football Hall of Famer and Chairman of the National Football Foundation. The Vincent dePaul Draddy Trophy is a trophy awarded by the National Football Foundation that is given to the American college football player with the best combination of academics, community service, and on-field performance. It is considered by many to be the "Academic Heisman."
Vic Fusia – former head football coach of the University of Massachusetts
Dick Tuckey – former professional American football running back
Pat Kirwan (football) – Receivers Coach and Personnel Assistant for the New York Jets under Pete Carroll. Currently Senior Football Analyst for the National Football League website.
Frank Gnup – Award winning and all-star Canadian football player, and later legendary coach of the University of British Columbia Thunderbirds.

Track & field
Steve Agar – Ran in the 1996 Summer Olympics
Ken Bantum – Participated in the shot put in the 1956 Summer Olympics
Anthony Colon – Ran in the 1972 Summer Olympics
Frank Crowley – Ran in the 1932 Summer Olympics
Lou Jones – World record holder at 400 meters; gold medalist in 4 × 400 meter relay in the 1956 Summer Olympics
Michael Keogh - Ran in the 1972 Summer Olympics
Doug Logan – CEO of USA Track & Field; first commission of Major League Soccer
Tom Murphy – Gold medalist in the men's 800 meters in 1959 Pan American Games, ran in the 1960 Summer Olympics
Ed O'Toole – Ran in the 1948 Summer Olympics
Aliann Pompey – Sprinter in the 2000 Summer Olympics, 2004 Summer Olympics, 2008 Summer Olympics, 2012 Summer Olympics
Dine Potter – Ran in the 1996 Summer Olympics
Paul Quirke – Participated in the shot put in the 1992 Summer Olympics
Lindy Remigino – Gold medalist in 100-meter dash and 4 × 100 relay in the 1952 Summer Olympics
Errol Thurton – Ran in the 1976 Summer Olympics

Other Sports
Ryan Hall (grappler) – winner of The Ultimate Fighter season 22, professional mixed martial artist in the Ultimate Fighting Championship

References